Mustafa Nawaz Khokhar (born 17 July 1978) is a Pakistani politician who has been a former Member of the Senate of Pakistan, from March 2018 to 10 November 2022.

Political career
Mustafa Nawaz Khokhar served as a member of the Senate of Pakistan from 2018-2022. During his tenure as senator he also held the chair of the Senate Committee on Human Rights and was known for picking up sensitive issues for parliamentary input and redressal. He resigned from the senate in 2022 after lending out support and speaking in favour of opposition colleagues who had publicly accused the government of which Senator Khokhar was a part, of political victimization and torture. Senator Khokhar also held the position of adviser to the Prime Minister of Pakistan on Human Rights from 2011-2013.

Political History 
His family has been active in politics from the capital city of Islamabad since 1985. Senator Khokhar’s father Muhammad Nawaz Khokhar was elected to the National Assembly of Pakistan as a member from Islamabad in general elections held in 1985, 1990 and 1993 respectively. From 1990-1993 late Muhammad Nawaz Khokhar served as the Deputy Speaker of the National Assembly and from 1995-1996 as a Federal Minister. His uncle Muhammad Afzal Khokhar has served as the chairman of the District Council from 1990-1993 which was the elected body of local government representatives of rural areas falling in the Islamabad Capital Territory and also as Deputy-Nazim (Mayor) of adjacent city of Rawalpindi from 2006-2010.

Senator Khokhar is a graduate in law from the University of Buckingham, UK and is a member of the Islamabad Bar Association.

References

Living people
Pakistan People's Party politicians
1970 births